2/4 may refer to

 February 4 (month-day date notation)
 2 April (day-month date notation)
 A duple time signature used, for example, for polkas
 2nd Battalion 4th Marines

See also
 One half (the reduced fraction )